The 2018 New Zealand census was the thirty-fourth national census in New Zealand, which took place on Tuesday 6 March 2018. The population of New Zealand was counted as 4,699,755 – an increase of 457,707 (10.79%) over the 2013 census.

Results from the 2018 census were released to the public on 23 September 2019, from the Statistics New Zealand website. The next New Zealand census is set to be held in March 2023.

History

Background
The Census Act 1877 required censuses to be held every fifth year and is well embedded in legislation and government systems. Since 1881, censuses have been held every five years, with the exceptions of those in 1931 and 1941 and the one in 2011 which was cancelled due to the February 2011 earthquake in Christchurch, which displaced many Canterbury residents from their homes only a few weeks before census day. It was rescheduled for March 2013, so the 2013 census is the previous census completed before this one.

Issues and controversies
In July 2018, it was estimated that the 2018 census had a “full or partial” response for 90 percent of individuals, down from 94.5 percent in the 2013 census and the planned release date for census information was changed from October of the same year to March 2019. This drop, which already amounted to the lowest census response rate for fifty years, was blamed on a 'digital-first' policy for the census. An independent review was initiated by the Government Statistician in October 2019, and in November Statistics NZ announced that release of census data would be pushed back to at least April 2019 due to "the complex nature of the task".

In early April 2019, the Government Statistician, Liz MacPherson was facing possible charges of contempt of parliament. She had twice refused, on 13 February and in early April, to disclose the number of partially and fully completed responses. On 9 April, she reported that one in seven New Zealanders, 700,000 people, failed to complete the census.

In July 2019 the independent inquiry returned its findings to the Government Statistician, the Minister of Statistics and the State Services Commissioner, reporting that too little attention had been paid to the non-digital aspects of the census, but also blamed operational complexity and flaws in management. Due to a decision to conduct the census primarily online, the census attracted only an 83% response rate, even lower than the 90% earlier reported, and well short of the 94% census percent target and a nine percent drop from the previous 2013 New Zealand census.

On 13 August 2019 the report was released to the public and Liz MacPherson offered her resignation, taking ultimate responsibility for the results, stating “I'm sorry, the buck stops with me.” State Services Commissioner Peter Hughes agreed with her assessment, and asked MacPherson to remain in her role until Christmas of 2019, noting that “she is the best person to finish the remediation work.”

Topics
The 2018 census collected data on the following topics:

Population structure

Location

Culture and identity

Education and training

Work

Income

Families and households

Housing

Transport

Health and disability

Projections
Statistics New Zealand annually conducts population projections for New Zealand as a whole, which are based on data from the previous census (in this case, the 2013 census) and calculated using a cohort-component method. Population projections also take into consideration births, deaths, and net migration.

In 2016, New Zealand's population at the time of the 2018 census was projected to be between 4,807,000 and 4,944,000.

Results 
Data uses fixed random rounding to protect confidentiality; each data point is rounded either to the nearest multiple of 3 ( chance) or the next-nearest multiple of 3 ( chance).

The census usually-resident population count of New Zealand is a count of all people who usually live in and were present in the country on census night (6 March 2018), and excludes overseas visitors and New Zealand residents who are temporarily overseas.

Due to the high rate of non-response in the census, the published results combine answers from census forms with data from the 2013 Census and from government administrative data. Reports from an External Data Quality Review Panel include quality ratings for each variable, taking the added data into account

Population and dwellings
Population counts for regions of New Zealand. All figures are for the census usually-resident population count.

 Resident population count was 4,699,755, up 457,707 from the 2013 Census.
 There are 2,319,558 males in New Zealand (49.35% of the population) and 2,380,197 females (50.65% of the population).
 On average, the population grew by around 2.1% per year since the 2013 Census – significantly higher than the annual average growth between 2006 and 2013, which was 0.7%.
The higher growth rate is consistent with higher net migration of 259,000 in the five years ended 30 June 2018 compared with 59,000 in the seven years ended 30 June 2013.
Among children (under 15 years), males outnumbered females, with around 105 males for every 100 females. The ratio declined with age: there were 104 males for every 100 females in the age group of 15–29, 95 males for every 100 females at ages 30–64 years, and 87 males for every 100 females at age 65 or above.
There was a total of 1,855,962 occupied and unoccupied private dwellings, 108,558 more than in 2013.
Ten percent of private dwellings were unoccupied.

Birthplace
In 2018, 3,370,122 people (71.7%) were born in New Zealand, with 1,329,633 (28.3%) born overseas.

Data is for the census's usually-resident population.

Ethnicity 

There was no change in the top five ethnicities between the 2013 and 2018 censuses, which are New Zealand European (64.1%), Māori (16.5%), Chinese (4.9%), Indian (4.7%), and Samoan (3.9%).

Data is for the census usually-resident population count.

Results add up to over 100% due to people declaring multiple ethnicities.

Religion 
Most New Zealanders, 48.5% of the population, identify as being irreligious.
Data is for the census usually-resident population count.

Language 
The vast majority of New Zealanders, 95.4%, speak English; in second place is Māori, with 4.0% of the population being able to speak it.
Data is for the census usually-resident population count.

Māori descent 

18.5% of New Zealanders have at least some Māori descent.
Data is for the census usually-resident population count.

Age 
The largest age group is people aged 25 to 29, who comprise 7.3% of the population.
Data is the census usually-resident population count.

Sex 
Data is the census usually-resident population count.

Income 
Data is for the census usually-resident population count of people aged 15 years and over.

Industry of employment
Data is for the census usually-resident population count of employed people aged 15 years and over.

Home ownership 

Data is for the census usually-resident population count of people aged 15 years and over.

Marriage status 

Data is for the census usually-resident population count of people aged 15 years and over.

References

External links 
 

Censuses in New Zealand
Census
New Zealand